Božidar Matić (8 September 1937 – 12 May 2016) was a Bosnian politician who served as Chairman of the Council of Ministers of Bosnia and Herzegovina from February to July 2001. Additionally, he was Minister of Finance and Treasury during that period as well.

A member of the Social Democratic Party until his death, Matić was also president of the Academy of Sciences and Arts of Bosnia and Herzegovina from 1999 to 2014.

Career
Matić was born in Bogatić, Kingdom of Yugoslavia, present-day Serbia on 8 September 1937. Until 1990, he was a member of the League of Communists of Yugoslavia, during which he was an official in the Federal Executive Council. Following the breakup of Yugoslavia, Matić became a member of the Social Democratic Party of Bosnia and Herzegovina (SDP BiH) in 1992.

At the 2000 parliamentary election, the SDP BiH formed a coalition with the Party for Bosnia and Herzegovina to gain the majority and force the nationalist parties out of power. They gathered a coalition of many other small parties to create the "Alliance for Change". Matić became Chairman of the Council of Ministers and Minister of Finance and Treasury on 22 February 2001. The SDP BiH-led government facilitated the passage of the Election Law, which was not only an important step towards democracy, but also a prerequisite to Bosnia's accession to the Council of Europe. He served in both offices until July 2001.

Matić was president of the Academy of Sciences and Arts of Bosnia and Herzegovina from 1999 until June 2014 as well.

Death
Matić died on 12 May 2016 in Sarajevo, Bosnia and Herzegovina at the age of 78. He was buried in Sarajevo at the Bare Cemetery on 14 May, two days after his death.

References

External links

|-

1937 births
2016 deaths
People from Bogatić
Finance ministers of Bosnia and Herzegovina
Faculty of Electrical Engineering and Computing, University of Zagreb alumni
University of Belgrade School of Electrical Engineering alumni
Members of the Academy of Sciences and Arts of Bosnia and Herzegovina
Academic staff of the University of Sarajevo